Phunware Inc. is an American mobile software and blockchain company. It produces mobile applications for advertising and marketing purposes such as personalized ad targeting, location tracking, and cryptocurrency brand loyalty programs.

In 2020, Phunware was the fifth largest advertising technology company in politics, receiving criticism for its involvement with the Trump 2020 re-election campaign. In November of that year, it had more than 940 million monthly unique active devices and has 5 billion daily transactions, and had raised more than $120 million in capital since its founding.

History

The company was founded as Phunware, Inc. in Austin, Texas, on March 25, 2009, by Alan Knitowski (CEO) and Luan Dang (CTO).

In 2014, as part of a $30 million expansion, Phunware acquired Digby Mobile Commerce, also based in Austin. The acquisition included Dibgy's subsidiary Movaya, based in Seattle and Chengdu, for an undisclosed sum.

In 2017, the company acquired Odyssey, Simplikate, Digby, Tapit! ($23 million acquisition in 2017) and GoTV. 

Their customers in 2019 included Fox Networks Group, HID Global, American Made Media Consultants, Presidio Networked Solutions, and MD Anderson. Previous customers included Warner Brothers, NASCAR, NFL, and NBC Sports. Applications that send data to Phunware servers include the campus map for Cedars-Sinai Medical Center and GunDealio, an app for gun sales from Gun Talk Media. Phunware's location tracking was used, for instance, to target 2018 Democratic ads at participants in the anti-Trump 2017 Women's March in DC.

Phunware provided campaign data, including "users' daily digital trail", to the Trump reelection campaign, through a $3 million contract awarded by Brad Parscale's American Made Media Consultants. They also built the TrumpPence reelection app for the campaign in November 2019.

Phunware performed a reverse merger with Stellar Acquisitions III, a special-purpose acquisition company (or shell company) in December 2018, placing Phunware on the NASDAQ exchange.

The company's non-GAAP adjusted net revenues were stated at $19 million in 2019, down from $22.5 million in 2018. The GAAP gross revenue was $19 million in 2019 and $30.8 million in 2018. Fox Networks Group was 50% of the company's 2019 sales, up from 42% the previous year. Phunware's active Fox contract was completed in 2019, meaning the sales could go to zero. The company had 93 employees at the end of 2019, after reducing their workforce by 44. In March 2020 the company furloughed 37 people.

In 2020, Wikipedia co-founder Larry Sanger served on their advisory board.

On April 10, 2020, Phunware received $6.1 million in federally backed small business loans from JP Morgan Chase as part of the Paycheck Protection Program. The company received scrutiny over this loan for its connections to Donald Trump and Fox News. In defense, Crowder (COO) said companies that didn't apply "aren't doing their fiduciary duty", and said "Banks aren't loaning to unprofitable tech companies. There is no access to capital".

On April 17, 2020, the company received a delisting notice from NASDAQ due to the stock trading below a dollar. However, the company's shares increased to above a dollar before the stock was delisted.

On October 19, 2021, Phunware acquired computer system provider Lyte technology for $10.98 million to support their blockchain research and development efforts.

Court cases

On September 26, 2017, Phunware sued Uber Technologies for $3 million in unpaid services, accusing the ride-sharing company of failing to pay its invoices, court records from The Superior Court of California show. In response, Uber filed suit against Phunware, alleging the software company committed fraud by, among other things, allowing ads for the ride-sharing app to show up on unauthorized third party sites. Former employees said the startup looked for "new ways to diversify its revenue stream."

An October 9, 2020, SEC settlement shows that Phunware agreed to pay a total of $6 million—$4.5 million going to Uber—over claims of fraudulent advertising.

References

External links
 

Companies based in Austin, Texas
Software companies established in 2009
2009 establishments in Texas
Donald Trump 2020 presidential campaign
Companies listed on the Nasdaq